Dorcus parallelipipedus, the lesser stag beetle, is a species of stag beetle found in Europe.

Both sexes resemble the female stag beetle (Lucanus cervus), though they are a uniformly blackish colour rather than having the chestnut brown wing covers of the larger species.  Males have distinctly knobbed antennae, and although their jaws are somewhat larger than those of the females, they are nowhere near as large as those of many other male stag beetles. The lesser stag beetle is similar in appearance to the related antelope beetle (Dorcus parallelus) of North America.

Like those of other stag beetles, the white, C-shaped larvae feed on wood. Adults as well as larvae are found in very soft decaying wood of broad-leaved trees, especially ash (Fraxinus excelsior), beech (Fagus sylvatica) and apple (Malus spp).

Adults are active in summer and disperse by flying, and sometimes coming to outside lights. This is a widespread species in most of England and is generally common (except in the far north), coming into gardens wherever there are orchards, old hedges or large trees.

External links
http://maria.fremlin.de/stagbeetles/photos_dp.html
Photos of Dorcus parallelipipedus
 

Lucaninae
Beetles of Europe
Beetles described in 1758
Taxa named by Carl Linnaeus